Brandon Anthony Lindsey (born January 10, 1989) is an American football linebacker who is currently a free agent.

Early years
Lindsey attended Aliquippa Senior High School in Aliquippa, Pennsylvania, where he played both linebacker and running back. As a senior, he had 115 tackles on defense and rushed for 743 yards on offense.

College career
Lindsey played collegiate football at the University of Pittsburgh in Pittsburgh, Pennsylvania. He was redshirted as a true freshman in 2007. In 2008, he played special teams and was a backup linebacker. In 2009, as a defensive end, he had 18 tackles and four sacks. He moved back to linebacker in 2010 and was named to the second-team all-Big East squad after recording 51 tackles and 10 sacks.

Professional career

Although Lindsey was considered one of the best linebacker prospects in the 2012 NFL Draft, he was not drafted. After the draft, he signed a free-agent contract with the Pittsburgh Steelers. On June 28, 2012, Lindsey was released by the Steelers.

Lindsey signed with the Toronto Argonauts of the Canadian Football League on July 15, 2013. He was released by the team on July 29, 2013.

References

External links
Pittsburgh Panthers bio

1989 births
Living people
American football linebackers
American football defensive ends
Canadian football defensive linemen
American players of Canadian football
Pittsburgh Panthers football players
Sioux Falls Storm players
Pittsburgh Steelers players
Toronto Argonauts players
Players of American football from Pennsylvania
People from Aliquippa, Pennsylvania